Shivani Mehta is an Australian cricketer who currently plays for New South Wales in the Women's National Cricket League (WNCL). She plays as a right-handed batter.

Domestic cricket
Mehta plays grade cricket for Northern District Cricket Club. From a young age, Mehta played a variety of sports, including cricket, football, touch football and futsal.

In January 2023, Mehta made her debut for New South Wales, against South Australia in the Women's National Cricket League. In her second match for the side, she scored 34 runs opening the batting.

References

External links

Living people
Date of birth missing (living people)
Year of birth missing (living people)
Place of birth missing (living people)
Australian women cricketers
New South Wales Breakers cricketers